The C-Ville Weekly is an alternative weekly newspaper distributed around Charlottesville, Virginia. Dubbing itself "Charlottesville's News & Arts Weekly," in 2001, the newspaper made over $100,000 in profits.

In 2013 C-ville Weekly and other local newspaper Charlottesville Tomorrow entered a content sharing agreement with intent to improve journalism on education.

In June 2020 the newspaper laid off staff.  The remaining journalism team was two reporters, a part-time editor, and a budget to hire a copy editor as needed.

History
Hawes Spencer and Bill Chapman founded the paper as a bi-weekly in 1989.

In January 2002 newspaper owners Bill Chapman and Rob Jiranek dismissed Hawes Spencer as editor of C-Ville Weekly. In response Spencer and some other C-ville Weekly staff founded competing newspaper, The Hook. Cathryn Harding became editor in January 2002.

In 2011 the parent companies which owned C-ville Weekly and the Hook merged, re-uniting publications which had common origins.

In 2018 the arts and living reporter for Cville Weekly remarked that after the 2017 Unite the Right rally, there was more community support for journalism on local people of color.

References

External links
 C-Ville Weekly

Mass media in Charlottesville, Virginia
Alternative weekly newspapers published in the United States
1989 establishments in Virginia